Abduraxmon Karimov is chairman of the political party Adolatkhoh in Tajikistan.

References

Living people
Year of birth missing (living people)
Justice Party (Tajikistan) politicians
Place of birth missing (living people)